The 2009–10 FA Women's Premier League Cup was the 20th edition of the English football cup tournament for teams at both levels of the FA Women's Premier League (level 1, the National Division, and level 2, the Northern and Southern Divisions). The 2010 cup final was won by Leeds United, who defeated Everton 3-1. 

This was the last season of the Women's Premier League Cup as a top-level competition, before the formation of the FA Women's Super League in 2011 as the new top flight. Subsequently, three of the four semi-finalist teams in 2009–10 (Arsenal, Chelsea and runners-up Everton) moved to the Super League and did not compete in the next season's FA WPL. The WPL Cup in 2010–11 was contested by clubs at women's levels 2 and 3.

Preliminary round

1st round

2nd round

Quarter finals

Semi-finals

Final

See also
 2009–10 FA Women's Premier League
 2009–10 FA Women's Cup

FA Women's National League Cup
Prem